Madhu Sharma is an Indian cinema actress and producer. She has produced two Marathi and four Bhojpuri movies. She basically known for Bhojpuri cinema. She worked with all top actors of Bhojpuri such as "Ghulami" with Dinesh Lal Yadav (Nirahua), "Chhapara Ke Prem Kahani" with Ravi Kishan, "Khiladi" with Khesari Lal Yadav and "Maa Tujhe Salaam" with Pawan Singh.

Filmography

Awards
 Best Actress in Sabrang Award 2016.
 Best Actress in BIFA (Mauritius) 2015.
 Best Actress For Ghulami (2015 film) in IBFA (Dubai) 2016.
 Best Actress in Dada Saheb Phalke 2016.

References

External links
 
 
 

Living people
Actresses from Mumbai
Year of birth missing (living people)
Actresses in Bhojpuri cinema
Actresses in Telugu cinema
Indian film actresses
Actresses in Hindi cinema
Actresses in Kannada cinema
21st-century Indian actresses
Actresses from Jaipur
Indian women film producers
Film producers from Mumbai
Businesswomen from Rajasthan
Film producers from Rajasthan
Businesspeople from Jaipur